Rhectothyris is a genus of moths of the family Crambidae described by Warren in 1890.

Species
Rhectothyris rosea (Warren, 1896)

Former species
Rhectothyris gratiosalis (Walker, 1859)

References

Spilomelinae
Crambidae genera
Taxa named by William Warren (entomologist)